Parthenolide is a sesquiterpene lactone of the germacranolide class which occurs naturally in the plant feverfew (Tanacetum parthenium), after which it is named, and in the closely related tansy (Tanacetum vulgare). It is found in highest concentration in the flowers and fruit. Parthenolide's molecular structure depiction is often incorrect regarding the stereochemistry of the epoxide, although X-ray single crystal structures are available.

Lack of solubility in water and bioavailability limits the potential of parthenolide as a drug.

In vitro research
Parthenolide has a variety of reported in vitro biological activities, including:

Inhibition of HDAC1 protein without affecting other class I/II HDACs, which leads to sustained DNA damage response in certain cells (required for apoptosis).
Modulation of the NF-κB-mediated inflammatory responses in experimental atherosclerosis.
Inducing apoptosis in acute myelogenous leukemia (AML) cells, leaving normal bone marrow cells relatively unscathed. Moreover, the compound may get at the root of the disease because it also kills stem cells that give rise to AML.
Activity against Leishmania amazonensis.
Microtubule-interfering activity.
Agonist of the adiponectin receptor 2 (AdipoR2).
 Inhibition of mammalian thioredoxin reductase

References 

Adiponectin receptor agonists
Epoxides
Histone deacetylase inhibitors
Sesquiterpene lactones